Guaranda Canton is a canton of Ecuador, located in the Bolívar Province.  Its capital is the town of Guaranda.  Its population at the 2001 census was 81,643.

Demographics
Ethnic groups as of the Ecuadorian census of 2010:
Mestizo  49.1%
Indigenous  47.0%
White  2.3%
Montubio  0.8%
Afro-Ecuadorian  0.7%
Other  0.1%

Politics
Results of the Ecuadorian presidential elections of 2013 in Guaranda Canton:
Rafael Correa  (PAIS)  33.6%
Guillermo Lasso  (CREO)  30.2%
Lucio Gutiérrez (PSP)  20.2%
Alberto Acosta (UPI)  6.9%
Mauricio Rodas (SUMA)  4.7%
Álvaro Noboa  (PRIAN)  2.2%
Norman Wray  (Ruptura 25)  1.2%
Nelson Zavala (PRE)  0.9%

References

Cantons of Bolívar Province (Ecuador)